The Capella XS is a family of American high wing, tractor configuration, cabin aircraft that were produced in kit form by Capella Aircraft of Austin, Texas and intended for amateur construction.

Capella Aircraft went out of business in late 2007, and the series is no longer in production.

Design and development
The single seat SS model was introduced in 1988. All members of the design family were available as optionally conventional landing gear or tricycle gear-equipped aircraft.

The family of aircraft all share common design features, including an enclosed cabin-style fuselage, horizontal stabilizer and tail fin all constructed of welded 4130 steel tubing. The wing is framed from riveted aluminium tubing with all surfaces covered in doped aircraft fabric. The wing includes flaps and has an optional folding system for transport and storage.

The landing gear arrangement includes sprung-steel main gear and a similarly sprung steerable tail wheel or optional sprung-steel nose wheel.

The single-seat SS model was developed into a line of side-by-side two seaters with different engine and fuselage designs.

Variants
SS
The fuselage incorporates a rear window. First flown in 1988.
XS
The fuselage incorporates a rear window. First flown in 1990.
XLS
The fuselage incorporates a rear window. First flown in 1990.
XLS Super 100
Available in TR tricycle gear and TD taildragger models. The fuselage incorporates a rear window.
Fastback
First flown in 1995. Fuselage differs from the XS in that the rear window is eliminated and replaced with a high rear turtle deck, rendering the aircraft similar in appearance to a Piper J-3 Cub, Aeronca Champ or Taylorcraft B.

Specifications (XS)

See also

References

XS
1980s United States ultralight aircraft
Homebuilt aircraft
Single-engined tractor aircraft
High-wing aircraft